Crail in Fife was a royal burgh that returned one commissioner to the Parliament of Scotland and to the Convention of Estates.

After the Acts of Union 1707, Crail, Anstruther Easter, Anstruther Wester, Kilrenny and Pittenweem formed the Anstruther Easter district of burghs, returning one member between them to the House of Commons of Great Britain.

List of burgh commissioners

 1661–63: James Moncreiff, bailie  
 1665 convention, 1667 convention: John Daw, bailie 
 1678 convention, 1681–82: George Moncrieff, portioner of Sauchop, bailie 
 1685–86: John Preston 
 1689 convention, 1689–1701, 1702–07: George Moncrieff of Sanchope

See also
 List of constituencies in the Parliament of Scotland at the time of the Union

References

Constituencies of the Parliament of Scotland (to 1707)
Politics of Fife
History of Fife
Constituencies disestablished in 1707
1707 disestablishments in Scotland
Crail